The Independent Living Fund was set up in 1988 to fund support for disabled people with high support needs in the United Kingdom, enabling them to live in the community rather than move into residential care.

It is run  as a non-departmental public body with an office in Nottingham and about 120 staff. It provides support to 19,000 disabled people with the highest levels of need at a cost of about £320 million.  It operates as an independent discretionary trust funded by the Department for Work and Pensions and is managed by a board of trustees. Its aim is to combat social exclusion on the grounds of disability. The money is generally used to enable disabled people to live in their own homes and to pay for care, and in particular to employ personal assistants. Many of the beneficiaries would otherwise have to move to residential care homes.

In December 2010 the Government announced the closure of the Fund to new applicants, and in December 2012, following a consultation on the future of the Fund, it was announced that the Fund would be closed permanently from April 2015. The Government claimed that Local Authorities could meet the same outcomes as the ILF and proposed transfer for existing ILF recipients to their Local Authorities.

In May 2014 The Court of Appeal, in the case of Bracking and others v Secretary of State for Work and Pensions found that the Department for Work and Pensions' decision to close the Fund was not lawful, overturning the High Court decision of April 2013. It decided that the department had not complied with the Public Sector Equality Duties imposed by section 149 of the Equality Act 2010. The Court agreed that documents which the Minister, Esther McVey, had seen in the run up to her decision proved that "the Minister did not receive a sufficient understanding of the true threat to independent living for ILF users posed by the proposal to close the fund".  Lord Justice McCombe said 'there is simply not the evidence ... to demonstrate to the court that a focussed regard was had to the potentially very grave impact upon individuals in this group of disabled persons, within the context of a consideration of the statutory requirements for disabled people as a whole'.

The Government has announced that it will not appeal against this decision so the Fund will continue for the time being. Its future was the subject of a Westminster Hall debate on 18 June 2014.  The department has carried out a new equality impact assessment to justify the closure.

References

External links
 The Independent Living Fund

Disability in the United Kingdom
Social security in the United Kingdom